Gestsson is a patronymic (see Icelandic name). Notable people with the patronymic include:

 Auðunn Gestsson (1938–2020), Icelandic newspaper salesman
 Pálmi Gestsson (born 1957), Icelandic actor and voice actor
 Svavar Gestsson (1944–2021), Icelandic politician
 Teitur Gestsson (born 1992), Faroese football goalkeeper

Icelandic-language surnames